Acadian Village may refer to:
 Acadian Village (park), a privately owned historic site in Lafayette, Louisiana
 Acadian Village (Maine) a privately owned historic site in Van Buren, Maine, on the National Register of Historic Places
 Village Historique Acadien, a privately owned historic site in Caraquet, New Brunswick

 Le Village historique acadien de la Nouvelle-Écosse, in Pubnico-Ouest, Nova Scotia